The 2023 Borno State gubernatorial election will take place on 18 March 2023, to elect the Governor of Borno State, concurrent with elections to the Borno State House of Assembly as well as twenty-seven other gubernatorial elections and elections to all other state houses of assembly. The election—which was postponed from its original 11 March date—will be held three weeks after the presidential election and National Assembly elections. Incumbent APC Governor Babagana Umara Zulum has been renominated by his party.

The primaries, scheduled for between 4 April and 9 June 2022, resulted in Zulum winning the All Progressives Congress primary unopposed on 26 May while the Peoples Democratic Party nominated businessman Mohammed Ali Jajari on 25 May.

Electoral system
The Governor of Borno State is elected using a modified two-round system. To be elected in the first round, a candidate must receive the plurality of the vote and over 25% of the vote in at least two-thirds of state local government areas. If no candidate passes this threshold, a second round will be held between the top candidate and the next candidate to have received a plurality of votes in the highest number of local government areas.

Background
Borno State is a large, diverse northeastern state in the process of recovering from the worst of the Boko Haram insurgency. Still facing large-scale threats by and partial occupation from Boko Haram and ISWAP terrorists, the state also has to contend with an underdeveloped yet vital agricultural sector, desertification, and low education rates.

Politically, the 2019 elections confirmed the state's status as one of the most staunchly APC states in the nation as both Buhari and Zulum won the state by wide margins and every single legislative seat on the senatorial, house of representatives, and house of assembly levels were carried by APC nominees.

At the beginning of his term, Zulum said administration would focus on ending the insurgency, rebuilding the educational sector, creating jobs, and reconstructing abandoned communities. In terms of his performance, Zulum was praised for his outreach to Christian areas in the state's south that are heavily targeted by terrorists, the restoration of power to Bama, an early and proactive approach to the beginning of the COVID-19 pandemic, efforts to support internally displaced persons' return to their communities, and for signing the Child Protection Law but was criticized for ordering the reopening of schools in an insecure area, being insensitive in the aftermath of the Koshebe massacre, and rushing the closure of IDP camps before security could be guaranteed.

Primary elections
The primaries, along with any potential challenges to primary results, were to take place between 4 April and 3 June 2022 but the deadline was extended to 9 June.

All Progressives Congress 

On the primary date, Zulum was the sole candidate and won the nomination unanimously at the El-Kanemi Sports Centre in Maiduguri. In his acceptance speech, Zulum noted that combating insecurity was a priority in the wake of the Kala-Balge killings; he also rejected his long-rumored interest in the APC's vice presidential slot.

Nominated 
 Babagana Umara Zulum: Governor (2019–present) and former Commissioner of Reconstruction, Rehabilitation and Resettlement (2015–2018)
Running mate—Umar Usman Kadafur: Deputy Governor (2019–present)

Declined 
 Mohammed Abba-Aji: Northeast Governors Forum Executive Secretary (2020–present) and former Senator for Borno Central (2003–2007)
 Kashim Ibrahim-Imam: 2019 APC gubernatorial candidate, 2003 and 2007 PDP gubernatorial nominee, and son of First Republic politician Ibrahim Imam
 Abubakar Kyari: APC Deputy National Chairman (North) (2022–present), Senator for Borno North (2015–2022), former commissioner, and son of former Military Administrator of North-Central State Abba Kyari
 Mohammed Ali Ndume: Senator for Borno South (2011–present) and former House of Representatives member for Chibok/Damboa/Gwoza (2003–2011)
 Idris Mamman Durkwa: 2019 APC gubernatorial candidate
 Mustapha Baba Shehuri: Minister of State for Agriculture and Rural Development (2019–present) and former Minister of State for Works, Power and Housing (2015–2019)

Results

People's Democratic Party 

On the primary date, an indirect primary held in Maiduguri with that ended with Mohammed Ali Jajari emerging as the PDP nominee by defeating 2019 nominee Muhammed Imam, 57% to 43%. After announcing the results, primary committee chairman Abdulrahman Bobboi urged those that had lost out to commit their support to Ali Jajari.

Nominated 
 Mohammed Ali Jajari: businessman
Running mate—Saleh Ahmed Kida

Eliminated in primary 
 Muhammed Imam: 2019 PDP gubernatorial nominee

Results

Minor parties 

 Buji Babagana (Action Alliance)
Running mate: Mohammed Abubakar
 Alhaji Monguno (Action Democratic Party)
Running mate: Hamid Zamzam Abbas
 Umar Abdulkadir (Action Peoples Party)
Running mate: Salihu Umar
 Fatima Abubakar (African Democratic Congress)
Running mate: Shettima Muhammad
 Musa Hassan (Allied Peoples Movement)
Running mate: Mayami Mustapha
 Kaka Goni Shettima (Boot Party)
Running mate: Bukar Mohammed
 Abdullahi Goni (Labour Party)
Running mate: Sanusi Salisu
 Mustapha Umar (National Rescue Movement)
Running mate: Yusuf Haruna
 Muhammad Bashir Maigawa (People's Redemption Party)
Running mate: Ali Gora Yakubu
 Modu Abba (Social Democratic Party)
Running mate: Fatima Lawan

Campaign
In the months after the primaries, the campaign was dominated by questions over the ability of Ali Jajari to challenge the strong APC hold of the state. Coupled with the pro-APC leaning of the state were accusations that the incumbent administration was suppressing the opposition, most notably when the NNPP campaign office was closed in August by order of the Borno State Urban Planning and Development Board as it allegedly violated zoning laws. After the NNPP protested the closure, Zulum ordered the unbarring of the office with a statement that "no matter the justification [for the closure], the timing is wrong." By September, the PDP had begun expressing fears of electoral fraud while the APC dismissed the PDP and NNPP as parties without widespread support in the state.

By 2023, attention largely switched to the presidential election on 25 February. In the election, Borno State voted for Bola Tinubu (APC); Tinubu won 54.2% of the vote, beating Atiku Abubakar (PDP) at 41.0%. Although the result was unsurprising as Borno is the home state of Tinubu's running mate—Kashim Shettima—and projections had favored him, the totals led to increased attention on the gubernatorial race as it was a much slimmer APC margin of victory than in recent previous elections. Gubernatorial campaign analysis from after the presidential election noted the role of Ali Jajari in the state PDP's renewal while noting NNPP support among Shuwa Arab and Hausa communities in addition to LP support among Christian communities. Pundits also observed that the boost of APC incumbency had been counteracted by weak areas where unpopular APC legislative candidates could drag down Zulum's vote share. Nevertheless, the EiE-SBM forecast projected Zulum to win based on "quantitative data and the convincing party victory in the presidential vote" while a Vanguard piece predicted a Zulum "walk over."

Projections

Conduct

Electoral timetable

General election

Results

By senatorial district 
The results of the election by senatorial district.

By federal constituency
The results of the election by federal constituency.

By local government area 
The results of the election by local government area.

See also 
 2023 Nigerian elections
 2023 Nigerian gubernatorial elections

Notes

References 

Borno State gubernatorial election
2023
2023 Borno State elections
Borno